Raymond Eric Cann (born 13 December 1937) is a male former diver who competed for England.

Diving career
He represented Great Britain in the Diving at the 1956 Summer Olympics.

He represented England and won a bronze medal in the 10 metres platform at the 1958 British Empire and Commonwealth Games in Cardiff, Wales.

References

External links
 

1937 births
Living people
English male divers
Olympic divers of Great Britain
Divers at the 1956 Summer Olympics
Commonwealth Games medallists in diving
Commonwealth Games bronze medallists for England
Divers at the 1958 British Empire and Commonwealth Games
Medallists at the 1958 British Empire and Commonwealth Games